The 2019 FIA Formula 2 Championship was the fifty-third season of the second-tier of Formula One feeder championship and also third season under the moniker of FIA Formula 2 Championship, a motor racing championship for Formula 2 cars that is sanctioned by the Fédération Internationale de l'Automobile (FIA). It is an open-wheel racing category that serves as the second tier of formula racing in the FIA Global Pathway. The category was run in support of the 2019 FIA Formula 1 World Championship.

George Russell was the reigning drivers' champion, having won the title at the final round of the 2018 championship in Abu Dhabi. Russell would drive in Formula One for Williams in 2019. Carlin were the reigning teams' champions, having secured their first Formula 2 title in Abu Dhabi. ART Grand Prix driver Nyck de Vries won the drivers' championship after the win in the Feature race at Sochi. In the teams' championship DAMS secured their first team title over UNI-Virtuosi Racing after the win in the Feature race at Abu Dhabi.

The season was marred by the death of French driver Anthoine Hubert during the feature race of the Spa-Francorchamps round on 31 August 2019. Hubert's death was the first fatality for a driver competing in FIA-sanctioned feeder series racing since Henry Surtees's fatal crash at Brands Hatch in 2009 in the FIA Formula Two Championship. The Formula One theme song composed by Brian Tyler, which debuted in the 2018 F1 season, would now be used in Formula 2 broadcasts.

Entries
The following teams and drivers competed in the 2019 championship. As the championship is a spec series, all competitors raced with an identical Dallara F2 2018 chassis with a V6 turbo engine developed by Mecachrome. Teams competed with tyres supplied by Pirelli.

Team changes

Russian Time left the championship after six years competing in Formula 2 and its predecessor, the GP2 Series. Their entry and assets were sold to Virtuosi Racing, who had operated the team. The new entry competes under the name "UNI-Virtuosi Racing". Fortec Motorsports had been granted an entry to the Formula 2 grid in 2018, but were later given permission to defer their entry until 2019. However, they were subsequently omitted from the draft entry list for the 2019 championship.

Arden International entered into a partnership with Mercedes-affiliated team HWA Racelab. Charouz Racing System formed a partnership with Sauber Motorsport, which currently runs Alfa Romeo's team in Formula 1. The Sauber-Charouz partnership is not affiliated with Alfa Romeo's Formula 1 entry.

Driver changes
Lando Norris left Carlin and the series as he was promoted to Formula 1 with McLaren. His seat was taken by Louis Delétraz, who left Charouz Racing System to join the team. He was joined by Nobuharu Matsushita, who returned to Formula 2 after a year spent racing in the Super Formula Championship, to replace Sérgio Sette Câmara.

Sette Câmara left Carlin to replace Alexander Albon at DAMS. Albon left the championship to join Formula 1 team Toro Rosso.

Arden drivers Nirei Fukuzumi and Maximilian Günther left the series. Fukuzumi moved to the Super Formula Championship with Dandelion Racing, while Günther joined the Formula E championship with Dragon Racing. Reigning GP3 Series champion Anthoine Hubert and GP3 Series regular Tatiana Calderón joined Arden in their place.

Artem Markelov and Tadasuke Makino left Russian Time and the championship. Both drivers moved to Japan to compete in the Super Formula Championship; Markelov joined Team LeMans while Makino joined Nakajima Racing. Guanyu Zhou graduated from the 2018 FIA Formula 3 European Championship, joining Russian Time's successors UNI-Virtuosi. Zhou was partnered by Luca Ghiotto, who raced with Russian Time in 2017 and Campos Racing in 2018.

Nikita Mazepin joined the championship with ART Grand Prix, the team he drove for when he finished runner-up in the 2018 GP3 Series. Mazepin was partnered with Nyck de Vries, who left Prema Racing to join the team. Mazepin and de Vries replaced 2018 series champion George Russell—who left the team and the championship  to join Formula 1 team Williams—and Jack Aitken, who switched to Campos Racing. Prema Theodore Racing named Mick Schumacher as de Vries' replacement. Schumacher continued his association with the team after he won the 2018 FIA Formula 3 European Championship with them.

Arjun Maini left Trident and the series to join RLR MSport in the European Le Mans Series. Giuliano Alesi joined the championship with Trident, the team he raced for in the GP3 Series. Dorian Boccolacci also left MP Motorsport, joining Jack Aitken at Campos Racing. Jordan King returned to the series with MP Motorsport, contesting the championship alongside his part-time NTT IndyCar Series campaign. Mahaveer Raghunathan returned to full-time competition for the first time since 2016, partnering King at MP Motorsport. Callum Ilott and Juan Manuel Correa joined the series, both signing with Sauber Junior Team by Charouz. Antonio Fuoco left Charouz and the series to join Formula One team Ferrari as a test driver.

Mid-season changes

Artem Markelov made a one-off return in Monaco as a replacement for Jordan King at MP Motorsport, who was competing in the 2019 Indianapolis 500 with Rahal Letterman Lanigan Racing. After collecting twelve penalty points on his racing license for incurring three Virtual Safety Car infringements during the Paul Ricard feature race, Mahaveer Raghunathan was banned from the series for the Red Bull Ring round. Raghunathan's MP seat was filled in Austria by 2018 Indy Lights champion and 2019 IndyCar Series driver Patricio O'Ward.

Shortly after the Paul Ricard round, Arjun Maini was announced to be replacing Dorian Boccolacci at Campos Racing for the Red Bull Ring and Silverstone rounds. Marino Sato replaced Maini prior to the Spa round.

After encountering funding problems, Ralph Boschung left Trident prior to the Red Bull Ring round. Former GP3 driver Ryan Tveter joined the team in Boschung's place. Tveter was later replaced by Boccolacci. Boschung returned to the team ahead of the Hungarian round.

BWT Arden was represented only by Tatiana Calderón at Monza after Anthoine Hubert's fatal accident. Juan Manuel Correa, who was also involved in the incident, was forced to miss the rest of the season due to injuries. Sauber Junior Team by Charouz did not replace him at Monza, running only Callum Ilott. Giuliano Alesi's car was impounded by Belgian authorities as part of their investigation into the accident at Spa, limiting Trident to a single entry for the next round. Ralph Boschung was stood down to allow Alesi to compete.

For the Sochi and Yas Marina rounds, Matevos Isaakyan, who raced in the 2018 European Le Mans Series, took Juan Manuel Correa's seat at Sauber Junior Team by Charouz. Artem Markelov replaced Anthoine Hubert at BWT Arden for the same rounds, although the Russian raced with #22 as the #19 had been retired for the remainder of the season in honour of the late French driver.

Calendar
The following twelve rounds were scheduled to take place as part of the 2019 championship. Round 9 was abandoned. The 2019 calendar retained the same twelve rounds from the 2018 season.

Results

Season summary

Championship standings

Scoring system
Points were awarded to the top 10 classified finishers in the Feature race, and to the top 8 classified finishers in the Sprint race. The pole-sitter in the feature race also received four points, and two points were given to the driver who set the fastest lap inside the top ten in both the feature and sprint races. No extra points were awarded to the pole-sitter in the sprint race as the grid for the sprint race were based on the results of the feature race with the top eight drivers having their positions reversed.

Feature race points

Sprint race points
Points were awarded to the top eight classified finishers, excluding the fastest lap points which are given to the top ten classified finishers.

Drivers' championship

Notes:
 – Drivers did not finish the race, but were classified as they completed more than 90% of the race distance.

Teams' championship

Notes:
 – Drivers did not finish the race, but were classified as they completed more than 90% of the race distance.

Notes

References

External links
 FIA Formula 2 Championship official website

 
FIA Formula 2 Championship seasons
FIA Formula 2
Formula 2